The Bellerose Village Municipal Complex is located at 50 Superior Road and Magee Plaza in Bellerose, New York. Designed by architect Anthony Waldeier in a combined Tudor Revival/Colonial Revival style, it has also served at the Bellerose Women's Club Building, Fire Hall and Police Booth. It was added to the National Register of Historic Places on September 28, 2006.

References

Colonial Revival architecture in New York (state)
Tudor Revival architecture in New York (state)
Government buildings completed in 1930
Buildings and structures in Nassau County, New York
National Register of Historic Places in Hempstead (town), New York
Government buildings on the National Register of Historic Places in New York (state)